The Bohr Festival was a series of seven lectures given by Niels Bohr 12 to 22 June 1922 at the Institute of Theoretical Physics in Göttingen. These were the Wolfskehl Lectures, funded by the Wolfskehl Foundation. Taking place in the fortnight leading up to the Göttingen International Handel Festival, it became known as the Bohr Festival. In 1991, Friedrich Hund suggested that James Franck responsible for the comparison.

In the lectures Bohr outlined the current development of the Bohr-Sommerfeld theory, remarking "how incomplete and uncertain everything still is".

References 

1920 in Germany
Quantum mechanics